We'll Live and Die in These Towns – single by British rock band The Enemy from their debut album We'll Live and Die in These Towns. The single was released in 2007 and has peaked 21 place in the UK Singles Chart.

Music video
In March 2008, was filmed a video for this song by WMG. The video shows three members of the group in the evening riding in the car and looking through the window at their native city. Tom Clarke sings about his native city, where the group was founded, and which, despite all the disadvantages stay native forever.

External links
 Music video
 The lyrics

2007 singles
2007 songs
The Enemy (UK rock band) songs